Lundholm Gym is a 3,000-seat multi-purpose arena in Durham, New Hampshire. It is home to the University of New Hampshire Wildcats athletics program, including men's and women's basketball, women's volleyball, and women's gymnastics.  

Lundholm Gym is the major component of the UNH Field House, which was completed in 1938 just to the northeast of Alumni Field, as part of the new athletics area. The gymnasium was renamed on December 2, 1968, to honor Carl Lundholm, '21, athletic director at the school from 1939 to 1963.

See also
 List of NCAA Division I basketball arenas

References

External links 
 Lundholm Gym

Indoor arenas in New Hampshire
College basketball venues in the United States
College gymnastics venues in the United States
College volleyball venues in the United States
Sports venues in New Hampshire
Basketball venues in New Hampshire
New Hampshire Wildcats men's basketball
Buildings and structures in Strafford County, New Hampshire
University of New Hampshire buildings